Jul med Hep Stars (Christmas with Hep Stars) is the third studio album by Swedish pop group Hep Stars, released through the Olga label. In 2001, it was rereleased by EMI. The album is made up by arrangements of well-known traditional Swedish Christmas songs mixed with somewhat newer tracks such as "Alla Sover Utom Jag".

Track listing

References

Hep Stars albums
1967 Christmas albums
Christmas albums by Swedish artists
Pop Christmas albums
Swedish-language albums